Seger is a surname.

Seger may also refer to:

Seger, Pennsylvania, unincorporated community, Pennsylvania, United States
CSS A. B. Seger, 19th century American gunboat
Seger cone, or pyrometric cone
Seger Indian Training School, Oklahoma, United States
 Seger, Israeli title of Close, Closed, Closure, an Israeli film

See also